Béla Székely (Born. as Béla Weisz  17 July 1889 – 10 January 1939) was a Hungarian politician, who served as Minister of Finance in 1919 (until 24 June with Gyula Lengyel). After the fall of the Hungarian Soviet Republic he emigrated to Austria. From 1930, Székely worked in Berlin later lived in the Soviet Union. In 1938 he was arrested and executed during the Great Purge.

References

Sources
 Magyar Életrajzi Lexikon

1889 births
1939 deaths
Jewish Hungarian politicians
Politicians from Budapest
Hungarian communists
Finance ministers of Hungary
Great Purge victims from Hungary
Hungarian emigrants to the Soviet Union
Executed communists